Sergei Gennadyevich Yegorov (born 26 October 1983) is a former Russian professional football player.

Club career
He played 9 seasons in the Russian Football National League for 7 different clubs.

External links
 

1983 births
People from Borovichi
Living people
Russian footballers
FC Ural Yekaterinburg players
FC Baltika Kaliningrad players
FC Luch Vladivostok players
FC Fakel Voronezh players
FC Petrotrest players
FC Arsenal Tula players
FC Dynamo Saint Petersburg players
Association football midfielders
FC Novokuznetsk players
FC Zenit-Izhevsk players
FC Torpedo Vladimir players
FC Chita players
Sportspeople from Novgorod Oblast